The Merriwa railway line is in the Hunter Valley of Northern New South Wales, Australia. 
The line was completed to Merriwa on 29 October 1917, however the section north west of Sandy Hollow closed in 1988. 
There are 3 mines, Bengalla & Mt Pleasant, just southwest & west of Muswellbrook & Mangoola, 1/2 way to Denman with Ballon Loops of this line & a number of Passing Sidings have been built with the traffic to / from the 3 mines @ Ulan near Gulgong.
The section between Muswellbrook and Sandy Hollow, combined with the Sandy Hollow – Gulgong railway line (formally known as the Sandy Hollow to Maryvale Railway Line when being constructed) forms the Australian Rail Track Corporation's Ulan line between Muswellbrook and Gulgong on the Gwabegar railway line.

Restoration of Sandy Hollow to Merriwa section 

A small group tried to form a preservation society (which was to be called Merriwa Railway Museum) to restore the station and goods shed to their original condition, as well as the railway yard including the historic steam era turntable and steam locomotive water column. The aim was to restore the line and have a steam locomotive run on it again using historic New South Wales Government Railways rolling stock. It was intended for tourists and train enthusiasts alike. This group was started in early 2002 but failed to progress.
 

A new railway society, The Merriwa Railway Society Incorporated (MRS), was officially launched in Merriwa on 24 October 2009, with more than 42 locals and rail enthusiasts in attendance. Consultation has been undertaken with Upper Hunter Shire Council, the Australian Rail Track Corporation and the Independent Transport Safety and Reliability Regulator.

Since August 2009, the intentions and plans of MRS have been reported in 5 regional and Sydney based newspapers and on the local Upper Hunter ABC radio station, increasing local residents' awareness of the heritage railway restoration plans. Of recent times the appearance of the station has improved with painting.

Gallery

References

External links

 Merriwa Railway Society

Regional railway lines in New South Wales
Standard gauge railways in Australia
Railway lines opened in 1917
Railway lines closed in 1988